Royal Naval Air Station Machrihanish (HMS Landrail), is a former Royal Navy air station, close to Campbeltown in Argyll and Bute, Scotland.

Location
Located 3 miles (5 km) west of Campbeltown on the western side of the Kintyre Peninsula, Machrihanish is a former RAF air station, notable for its weather forecasts. The base had an exceptionally long runway (3049m / 10,000 feet), together with a large number of technical buildings and accommodation.

History
Machrihanish was established as a naval air station in 1916, operating maritime patrol aircraft and airships until 1918. A new airfield opened on 15 June 1941 as Strabane Naval Air Station, and named HMS Landrail, becoming RNAS Machrihanish later in the month and operated until 1946. The old airfield became HMS Landrail II. 

The Air Station was re-activated again during the Korean War for training purposes. Between 1960 and 1962, the base was reconstructed and the current runway built. Thereafter the base developed in relation to NATO requirements during the Cold War, and was the focus of anti-submarine operations with US-controlled nuclear depth charges. A US Navy SEAL unit is also said to have been based here. £10 million was spent to upgrade the station in the early 1990s, keeping it on a care-and-maintenance basis to provide a runway for emergencies or in the event of conflict. The base remained a UK and NATO military base until 1997.

Campbeltown Airport
Between the wars a commercial aerodrome was established and is still operated by the government-owned Highlands and Islands Airports Limited operates with IATA location code "GQJ". It uses the same single runway which, at 3049m (10,000 feet), is the longest in Scotland. The terminal building are at the south-eastern end. There are scheduled flights to Glasgow.

Units 
A number of units were here at some point:

References

Buildings and structures in Argyll and Bute
Military of Scotland
Machrihanish